Doenitzius is a genus of Asian dwarf spiders that was first described by R. Oi in 1960.  it contains three species: D. minutus, D. peniculus and D. pruvus.

See also
 List of Linyphiidae species (A–H)

References

Araneomorphae genera
Linyphiidae
Spiders of Asia
Spiders of Russia